Sufia Rahman is a former Health and Family Welfare Adviser of the government of Bangladesh. She served in the caretaker government of President Iajuddin Ahmed in 2006–2007. She is a consultant and chief advisor of Euro-Bangla Heart Hospital Ltd.

References

Living people
Advisors of Caretaker Government of Bangladesh
Year of birth missing (living people)